The Mid West Community Cup is a rugby league competition in the Central West area of New South Wales. The premiers are awarded the Blayney Citizens' Cup, the oldest continuously awarded trophy in Country Rugby League, with Neville the first recipients in 1913. For all intents and purposes, it is a third division competition in the Group 10/11 area. 

In its last season under its original model in 2021, the competition encompassed teams from Bathurst, Kandos, Lithgow, Oberon, Orange and Portland. Some of the remaining clubs in the competition merged into the Woodbridge Cup in 2022 after two incomplete seasons due to the COVID-19 Pandemic. However, the competition reformed in late 2022 under a new community cup model similar to Group 17. The three clubs that emerged from the ailing original format of the competition to join the Woodbridge Cup did not rejoin the competition as they sought a higher standard of football, paving the way for the return of other older clubs.

Current Clubs 
Four clubs are currently listed as part of the new Mid West Community Cup competition. The inaugural edition of the competition is likely to run as a double round robin with finals to follow, with a total seven week season in 2022.

Former Clubs

2021 Season Teams

Five teams competed in the 2021 season including former Group 10 side Oberon Tigers, with the women's grade having six teams (Kandos being the extra). The teams were:

‡ indicates active participant in the Mid West Community Cup

Former Teams
More than 40 teams have reportedly featured in the Mid West Cup over the course of its history. They include:

History

The Mid West Cup was originally organised as a rugby union competition but made the switch to rugby league after the First World War. The first winner of the competition was Neville and the club awarded the Blayney Citizens' Cup, the oldest trophy still in regular use in Country Rugby League.

While the competition was traditionally based in around the Blayney region, in the 1950s it expanded into Rockley, Carcoar and Cullen Bullen before it was absorbed in the Group 10 Rugby League and renamed the Group 10 Second Division in 1970. It adopted its current name of the Mid West Cup in 1990. The competition only featured four teams in 2019, including CSU Mungoes, Lithgow Bears, Orange Barbarians and Portland Colts, but will expand to eight in 2020 with the inclusion of the reformed Blackheath Blackcats and Kandos Waratahs, Oberon Tigers (who have been relegated from Group 10) and the newly-formed Orange United.

The competition's last season under its original model was in 2021, and encompassed teams from Bathurst, Kandos, Lithgow, Oberon, Orange and Portland. The three remaining clubs in the competition (CSU, Oberon and Orange United) merged into the Woodbridge Cup in 2022 after two incomplete seasons due to the COVID-19 Pandemic. However, the competition reformed in late 2022 under a new community cup model similar to Group 17. The three clubs that emerged from the ailing original format of the competition to join the Woodbridge Cup did not rejoin the competition as they sought a higher standard of football, paving the way for the return of other older clubs such as Carcoar, as well as the introduction of Burrangong for the first time.

Premierships

 1913: Neville 
 1914: Newbridge 
 1918: Mandurama 
 1922: Blayney Bears
 1923: Blayney Blues
 1924: Blayney Milita 
 1925: Blayney Milita 
 1926: Blayney Waratahs 
 1927: Browns Creek 
 1928: Browns Creek 
 1931: Carcoar 
 1932: Barry 
 1948: Blayney Institute 
 1949: Carcoar 
 1950: Carcoar
 1951: Milthorpe
 1952: Barry-Neville
 1953: Barry-Neville
 1956: Rockley
 1957: Carcoar
 1958: Carcoar
 1959: Carcoar
 1960: Carcoar
 1961: Cullen Bullen
 1962: Carcoar
 1966: Carcoar
 1967: Carcoar
 1968: Carcoar
 1969: Carcoar
 1970: Blayney Bears
 1971: Carcoar
 1972: Kandos
 1973: Carcoar
 1974: Kandos
 1975: Mitchell College
 1976: Wallerawang
 1977: Wallerawang
 1978: Rylstone-Kandos
 1979: Rylstone-Kandos
 1980: Blackheath
 1981: Rylstone-Kandos
 1982: Carcoar
 1983: Woodstock
 1984: Portland
 1985: Carcoar
 1986: Blackheath
 1987: Gulgong
 1988: Carcoar
 1989: Blackheath
 1990: Blackheath
 1991: Wallerawang
 1992: Blackheath
 1993: Blackheath
 1994: Carcoar
 1995: Lithgow Bears
 1996: Mudgee
 1997: Gulgong
 1998: Portland
 1999: Gulgong
 2000: Wallerawang
 2001: Wallerawang
 2002: Blackheath
 2003: Oberon
 2004: Gulgong
 2005: Blackheath
 2006: Blayney Bears
 2007: Gulgong
 2008: Portland
 2009: Kandos
 2010: Lithgow Bears
 2011: Lithgow Bears
 2012: CSU Blue
 2013: Kandos
 2014: CSU Yellow
 2015: Blackheath
 2016: Villages United
 2017: Wallerawang
 2018: Blackheath
 2019: CSU
 2020: Oberon
 2021: CSU
 2022: Carcoar

See also

Rugby League Competitions in Australia

References

External links
Group 10 ladder - from Sporting Pulse
Group 10 on Country Rugby League's official site

 Lithgow Storm Junior Rugby League

Rugby league competitions in New South Wales
Central West (New South Wales)